Paul James Smith Jr. (born 6 October 1982) is a British former professional boxer who competed from 2003 to 2017, and has since worked as a commentator. He held the English middleweight title in 2008, the British super-middleweight title twice between 2009 and 2014, and challenged three times for a super-middleweight world title. As an amateur, he won a silver medal in the light middleweight division at the 2002 Commonwealth Games.

Amateur career
Smith started boxing at age nine with the Rotunda amateur boxing club and fought in South Africa, Uzbekistan, and Denmark representing England. He comes from a family of boxers and he and his brothers (Stephen, Liam, and Callum) became the first group of siblings to all win ABA titles. Paul won silver medals for his country in the 2001 Copenhagen Cup and 2002 Commonwealth Games, losing to Jean Pascal by two points; Smith was then picked up by Frank Warren and turned professional.

Professional career

Early career
Smith's career has featured many bouts held mainly in the UK, Germany and the USA. He has faced Andre Ward and Arthur Abraham for the WBO Super-Middleweight title twice. The first was a controversial decision.

On 10 March 2007, he KO'd the Belgian, Alexander Polizzi in Liverpool, winning the WBU international middleweight title in the eighth round.

On 20 March 2007, Smith took part in boxing's answer to Golf's Ryder Cup fighting American Jonathan Reid; the Nashville, Tennessee resident lost to Smith on a technical knockout.

The Contender
On 4 September 2007, Smith joined nine other boxing hopefuls as members of season three of The Contender. Smith fought rival David Banks from Portland, Oregon, and ended with a win for Smith by split-decision. However, since Smith had the lowest point total out of the remaining boxers, he was disqualified. The victory over David Banks was fought in Pasadena, California and was broadcast on ESPN and ITV; Ray Leonard said Smith let his anger take away from his ability. Smith was left with two cuts, one on his nose and another around his eye; this meant he was medically unfit to continue the contest regardless of performance.

Smith returned to England and defeated Cello Renda to win the vacant English middleweight title. He lost the title in his very next fight against Steven Bendall on 21 June 2008 in Birmingham, England, on a much contested points decision.

British super-middleweight champion
On 30 October 2009, Smith challenged Tony Quigley for the British super-middleweight title in Liverpool's Echo Arena. Quigley was the holder of the British title after defeating Tony Dodson only months earlier at the same venue. The fight was a tight affair with Smith eventually winning via split decision over 12 rounds thus crowning him the new British super-middleweight title holder.

Smith's first defense of his title came in his thirtieth professional contest at the Echo Arena, Liverpool on 12 March 2010, against Tony Dodson. Smith won again, this time via a unanimous 12-round decision.

Smith boxed Beijing 2008 gold medalist, James DeGale at the Echo Arena, Liverpool on 11 December 2012. The fight was stopped in the ninth round as DeGale landed back-to-back left hooks on Smith, causing the latter to lose his British super-middleweight title.

Smith vs. Groves

After winning his next two fights, Smith once again challenged for the British title and the Commonwealth title against George Groves. The bout took place in Groves' native London at the Wembley Arena on 5 November 2011. Smith won the opening round on all three judges cards and landed a hard shot on Groves towards the end of the round. One minute into the second round, however, a lead overhand right from Groves to Smith's jaw floored him. Smith was able to beat the count only to be dropped again, forcing the referee to halt the contest.

Smith vs. Abraham
On 27 September 2014, Smith fought WBO Super-Middleweight title holder Arthur Abraham in Kiel, Germany. Despite arguably outworking Abraham for the full 12 rounds, the judges ruled in the Armenian's favour by scores of 119–109, 117–111 and 117–110. Many ringside observers saw the fight as being far closer than the judges ruled it and Smith's promoter Eddie Hearn labelled the judges scores a "disgrace."

The two met in a rematch on February 21, 2015, at the O2 World Arena in Berlin. This also went the full 12 rounds as Abraham won via points on all three scorecards (116-112, 117-111 twice).

Smith vs. Ward
After his loss to Abraham, Smith faced top pound for pound boxer, Andre Ward. This was Ward's first fight in 19 months, following a promotional dispute which sidelined him and caused him to lose his titles. The fight was scheduled for June 20, 2015 at the Oracle Arena in California at a 172 lbs catchweight fight. The fight was to take place on BET. Ward won via TKO in the 9th round. Ward was winning every round at the time of stoppage (80-72, 3 times). Smith missed weight, coming in at 176.4 lbs and was fined 20% ($45,000) of his $225,000 purse by the California State Athletic Commission, half of which went to Ward and half to the commission. Despite being available in over 90 million homes, the fight averaged 323,000 viewers on BET.

Smith vs Kubin 
In his comeback fight, Smith faced Bronislav Kubin. Smith dropped Kubin twice in the second round, and managed to finish his opponent in the third round, to get his comeback win.

Smith vs Grafka 
Smith won the second fight of his comeback too, this time a 59 to 55 points victory over six rounds, against Bartlomiej Grafka.

Smith vs Regi 
On 10 September 2016 Smith fought Daniel Regi on the Golovkin vs Brook undercard. Smith dropped his opponent several times, en route to a fifth-round TKO win.

Smith vs. Zeuge
Smith's third and final world title challenge came against WBA (Regular) super middleweight champion Tyron Zeuge in June 2017 at Rittal Arena Wetzlar. The younger Zeuge proved to be too much for Smith, as he won a wide unanimous decision (119-108, 119–108, 119–108). Zeuge outworked Smith with his jab and was able to score a knockdown in round 12.

Music career
As well as being a boxer, Smith is a resident DJ at the 'Society' nightclub in Liverpool. He co-wrote the Ultrabeat song "Better Than Life", with Mike Di Scala and has remixed the song "Falling Stars (Waiting For A Star To Fall)" by Sunset Strippers, also with Di Scala.

Personal life
Paul Smith comes from a family of professional boxers, which includes Stephen Smith, Liam Smith, and Callum Smith.

Professional boxing record

References

External links

Paul Smith - Profile, News Archive & Current Rankings at Box.Live

1982 births
Living people
Middleweight boxers
Boxers at the 2002 Commonwealth Games
Commonwealth Games silver medallists for England
Boxers from Liverpool
The Contender (TV series) participants
English male boxers
Super-middleweight boxers
Commonwealth Games medallists in boxing
Light-middleweight boxers
England Boxing champions
British Boxing Board of Control champions
Medallists at the 2002 Commonwealth Games